Abakan (Khakas: , Ağban, or , Abaxan) is the capital city of the Republic of Khakassia, Russia, located in the central part of Minusinsk Depression, at the confluence of the Yenisei and Abakan Rivers. As of the 2010 Census, it had a population of 165,214—a slight increase over 165,197 recorded during the 2002 Census and a further increase from 154,092 recorded during the 1989 Census.

History
Abakansky ostrog, also known as Abakansk, was built at the mouth of the Abakan River in 1675. In the 1780s, the selo of Ust-Abakanskoye was established in this area. It was granted town status and given its current name on 30 April 1931.

Chinese exiles

In 1940, Russian construction workers found ancient ruins during the construction of a highway between Abakan and Askiz. When the site was excavated by Soviet archaeologists in 1941–1945, they realized that they had discovered a building absolutely unique for the area: a large (1500 square meters) Chinese-style, likely Han dynasty era (206 BC–220 AD) palace. The identity of the high-ranking personage who lived luxuriously in Chinese style, far outside the Han Empire's borders, has remained a matter for discussion ever since. Russian archaeologist  surmised, based on circumstantial evidence, that the palace may have been the residence of Li Ling, a Chinese general who had been defeated by the Xiongnu in 99 BCE, and defected to them as a result. While this opinion has remained popular, other views have been expressed as well.

Lithuanian exiles
In the late 18th and during the 19th century, Lithuanian participants in the 1794, 1830–1831, and 1863 rebellions against Russian rule were exiled to Abakan. A group of camps was established where prisoners were forced to work in the coal mines. After Stalin's death, Lithuanian exiles from the nearby settlements moved in.

Administrative and municipal status
Abakan is the capital of the republic. Within the framework of administrative divisions, it is incorporated as the City of Abakan—an administrative unit with the status equal to that of the districts As a municipal division, the City of Abakan is incorporated as Abakan Urban Okrug.

Economy
The city has an industry enterprises, Katanov State University of Khakasia, and three theatres. Furthermore, it has a commercial center that produces footwear, foodstuffs, and metal products.

Transportation

Abakan (together with Tayshet) was a terminal of the major Abakan-Taishet Railway. Now it is an important railway junction.

The city is served by the Abakan International Airport.

Military
The 100th Air Assault Brigade of the Russian Airborne Troops was based in the city until circa  1996.

Sites

Abakan's sites of interest include:
 Holy Transfiguration Cathedral (Russian: Спасо-Преображенский кафедральный собор (Spaso-Preobrazhenskiy kafedral’nyy sobor))
 "Good Angel of Peace" sculpture (Russian: Скульптура «Добрый ангел мира» (Skul’ptura «Dobryy angel mira»))
 Park of Topiary Art (Russian: Парк топиарного искусства (Park Topiarnogo Iskusstva))
 Khakas National local history museum named after Leonid Kyzlasov  (Russian: Хакасский краеведческий музей имени Л.Р. Кызласова (Khakasskiy Natsional'nyy Krayevedcheskiy Muzey Im. L.R. Kyzlasova))

Sports
Bandy, similar to hockey, is one of the most popular sports in the city. Sayany-Khakassia was playing in the top-tier Super League in the 2012–13 season but was relegated for the 2013–14 season and has been playing in the Russian Bandy Supreme League ever since. Russian Government Cup was played here in 1988 and in 2012.

Geography

Climate 

Abakan has a borderline humid continental (Köppen climate classification Dwb)/cold semi-arid climate (Köppen BSk). Temperature differences between seasons are extreme, which is typical for Siberia. Precipitation is concentrated in the summer and is less common because of rain shadows from nearby mountains.

References

Notes

Sources

External links

 Official website of Abakan
 Unofficial website of Abakan
 Directory of organizations in Abakan
Abakan city streets views
   Beyaz Arif Akbas, "Khakassia: The Lost Land", Portland State Center for Turkish Studies, 2007

 
Cities and towns in Khakassia
Yeniseysk Governorate
Populated places established in 1675
1675 establishments in Russia
Populated places on the Yenisei River
Renamed localities in Russia